Pilsbach is a town in the Austrian state of Upper Austria.

Geography
Pilsbach lies in the area of Upper Austria known as the Hausruckviertel, about 4 km from Vöcklabruck. The total area of the town is 10.2 km², of which 45.1% is forested and 49% is used for agriculture. The town is divided into the neighborhoods of Einwald, Kien, Kirchstetten, Mittereinwald, Oberpilsbach, Schmidham, Untereinwald, and Unterpilsbach.

History
Originally in the eastern portion of the Duchy of Bavaria, the town has belonged to Duchy of Austria since the 12th century. The town was occupied multiple times during the Napoleonic Wars. It became part of Upper Austria in 1918. After the Nazi annexation of Austria (Anschluss), the town became part of "Gau Oberdonau", returning to Upper Austria in 1945.

Population

References

Cities and towns in Vöcklabruck District